Lu Yen-hsun was the defending champion, but chose not to participate.

Seeds

Draw

Finals

Top half

Bottom half

References
 Main draw
 Qualifying draw

OEC Kaohsiung - Singles
2015 Singles
2015 in Taiwanese tennis
Tennis tournaments in Taiwan